MLS Cup 2010, the 15th edition of Major League Soccer's championship match, was played between the Colorado Rapids and FC Dallas to decide the champion of the 2010 season. The championship was played at BMO Field in Toronto, Ontario, Canada on November 21, 2010. Colorado Rapids won 2–1 over Dallas on an own goal in extra time, as a shot by Rapids forward Macoumba Kandji was deflected on goal by Dallas defender George John. Played in Toronto, it marked the first time the league championship was played outside the United States. It was the fourth MLS Cup to match two teams from the same conference against each other, and the third to feature only Western Conference teams.

The match kicked off at 8:30 pm EST, and was televised by ESPN and Galavisión in the United States, and by TSN2 in Canada.

As a result of their victory, the Colorado Rapids earned direct Group Stage berth in the 2011–12 CONCACAF Champions League. FC Dallas earned a preliminary round spot in the Champions League.

Road to the final

FC Dallas 

It was FC Dallas' debut in the MLS Cup championship game, becoming the last of the surviving original MLS clubs to qualify for the MLS Cup championship match. The team qualified for the playoffs by finishing fourth place in the overall regular season standings, and third in the Western Conference. Dallas began their playoff campaign with a pair of home and away legs in the quarterfinals against Real Salt Lake, the defending cup champions. With Salt Lake finishing as the Supporters' Shield finalists, and coming off a convincing group stage run in the CONCACAF Champions League, Salt Lake were considered to be heavy favorites in the Western Conference semifinal.

The first leg of the quarterfinals was played at FC Dallas' home ground Pizza Hut Park on October 30, in the northern Dallas suburb of Frisco. Early in the match, Salt Lake striker Fabián Espíndola bagged a fifth-minute goal to give the visitors a critical away goal and a 1–0 lead in the match and on aggregate. The Hoops rebounded from the setback thanks to a 44th-minute equalizer from Jeff Cunningham. Shortly into the second half, things looked more promising for Dallas when a dangerous sliding tackle in the 49th minute from Salt Lake's midfielder Javier Morales resulted in an immediate red-card ejection from the match, resulting in the Royals having to play a man down. Kittian international, Atiba Harris was ejected in the 88th minute, causing a 10 vs. 10 match for the final two minutes before injury time. While things were looking to stay on parity for the first leg, a last-minute goal from Dallas' Eric Avila gave the Toros a needed 2–1 victory over RSL.

 Dallas traveled out to Salt Lake City to take on the Royals for the second leg on November 6. Although the Hoops had a 2–1 aggregate lead, they were playing in Rio Tinto Stadium, considered to be one of the most intimidating soccer atmospheres in the United States; where Salt Lake hadn't lost a match since May 2009. The match drew a near capacity crowd of roughly 19,500 spectators. In the 17th minute of the match, a goal from Dallas midfielder and American international Dax McCarty gave the Toros a 3–1 lead on aggregate and a 1–0 lead for the match. For a majority of the match, deep into the second half, did Dallas hold this lead. A late equalizer from Robbie Findley leveled the game at 1–1, but it was too little, too late for RSL as the Hoops would eliminate the defending champions 3–2 on aggregate.

November 6's victory over Salt Lake propelled Dallas into the Western Conference finals against the MLS Cup runners' up from last year, Los Angeles Galaxy. Heralding international superstars such as David Beckham and Landon Donovan, the Galaxy were coming off a stellar run in the regular season, capturing the MLS Supporters' Shield with a 17–7–8 record. The Galaxy had defeated Seattle Sounders in their quarterfinal series to qualify for the championship. Since the Galaxy were the top seed in the Western Conference bracket, while Dallas was the third; Los Angeles hosted the final.

In front of a sold-out capacity crowd of 27,000 at the Galaxy's home ground The Home Depot Center, the Hoops would dismantle the Galaxy with goals from David Ferreira, George John and Marvin Chávez. In addition to a berth in the MLS Cup championship, the 3–0 victory for Dallas, avenged their 2–0 loss at the HDC, and they handed the Galaxy their worst loss at home since a 4–1 defeat to the Puerto Rico Islanders in a Champions League play-in proper.

Colorado Rapids 

The Rapids came into the MLS Cup Playoffs as a dark horse team, finishing seventh overall in the standings, and fifth in the Western Conference. In spite of finishing fifth place in the Western Conference, the team was placed in the Eastern Conference bracket. The reason was that the Rapids qualified for the playoffs through a wildcard seed. For the MLS Cup Playoffs, wild card seeds qualify for the playoffs regardless of their conference, and consequently, may be placed in a conference they do not participate in. In the playoffs, the top two teams in both conferences are guaranteed playoff berths, while the remaining field is determined through a wildcard system. This system allowed for six Western Conference teams to enter, while only two Eastern Conference teams qualified.

This resulted in the two weakest Western Conference teams playing in the Eastern Conference bracket. Such pairings drew sharp criticism and confusion from fans and media alike, citing that the top Eastern Conference teams were not relatively the strongest teams in the league during the regular season, nor posed a significant threat to the Rapids.

The news broke with one more regular season match remaining for both Colorado and Columbus. Columbus finished the season with a 3–1 victory over 14th-placed Philadelphia Union, but their starting keeper William Hesmer was sidelined with a severe shoulder injury resulting in an early end to his season.

In spite of Columbus coming in as the second-place seed in the Eastern Conference bracket, many people expected Colorado to "upset" Columbus in their quarterfinal fixture. The Rapids hosted the Crew in the first leg on October 30; while Columbus would host Colorado a week later, on November 6. In the first leg, hosted in Commerce City, the Rapids won their match thanks to a 23rd-minute goal from club captain Pablo Mastroeni.  The lone goal gave the Rapids a goal advantage headed to Columbus a week later. In the second quarterfinal leg against the Crew, the Rapids fell 1–0 thanks to a 22nd-minute goal from Eddie Gaven. Things looked more convincing for Columbus when Robbie Rogers doubled the lead 2–0 in the 70th. With a 2–1 aggregate lead overall, Columbus look destined to make their first trip to the Eastern Conference championship since 2008. Fourteen minutes later, Rapids striker Conor Casey ruined the clean sheet for Crew backup keeper, Andy Gruenebaum and the aggregate score was leveled at two apiece.  After half an hour of additional time, the match was still equal at two. In a penalty kick shootout, a last-shot miss from Brian Carroll saw the Rapids advance to the semifinals and the Crew eliminated in the MLS Cup quarterfinals for the second consecutive year.

In the cup semifinals, Colorado faced eighth place MLS opponent San Jose Earthquakes who took a surprising 3–1 victory over New York to win the aggregate series a day earlier. The two sides met in Commerce City for the semifinal match. In the match, a 43rd-minute goal from Kosuke Kimura gave the Rapids the 1–0, which would eventually result in the game-winning goal. The victory sent Colorado to their first cup final since the 1997 MLS Cup final.

Pre-match

Venue selection

On March 31, 2010, MLS announced that the MLS Cup final would be played at BMO Field in Toronto. Before the decision, Commissioner Don Garber and the committee contemplated whether to have the cup final at the highest seed's home ground, or to have it at the stadium of the Supporters' Shield winner. In the end; however, the committee agreed to have the 2010 cup final at a neutral venue, although Garber subsequently said to the 2010 final that it's something that may change in the near future, as early as 2011. (Coincidentally, MLS Cup 2011, announced for Home Depot Center, was contested by LA Galaxy as one of the two teams in that final, which led the league to abandon the neutral-venue final permanently beginning in 2012.)

Television
The match was televised live in the United States on ESPN, making it the second consecutive year in league history the station carried the match live.  The broadcast was available in 1080p high definition.  Play-by-play announcer Ian Darke and color commentator John Harkes were in the booth. Darke was commentating his first MLS Cup final, making him the first British-speaker to commentate an MLS Cup match.  The pre-game show was hosted by Max Bretos with Alexi Lalas and Steve McManaman. The pregame show was a record-tying one hour before the match itself. The same crew did the post-game show, which was 30 minutes following the match.

Prior to the start of the actual match, ESPN suffered severe criticism from fans and the media for their irregular information regarding the championship.  At one point, ESPN posted on their website the wrong venue for the championship match,  and even failed to mention that the game itself was being carried on one of their channels.

With an average U.S. audience of 1.1 million viewers, the broadcast earned a Nielsen rating of 0.4, it was the lowest-rated MLS Cup broadcast in league history. This marked the ninth consecutive year in MLS Cup history that the league championship has failed to draw at least 1% of U.S. households watching television.  Many believed the reason was because the two sides playing in the cup final were among the least-supported clubs in the league. The 0.4 television rating was a 44% percent decline from 2009, in which there was a 0.9 rating nationwide.

The telecast's individual ratings in the Denver and Dallas–Fort Worth metropolitan areas have yet been disclosed. The numbers, were nearly 50% lower than the numbers Los Angeles and Salt Lake drew last year, where the Los Angeles area drew a 1.9 rating, while Salt Lake drew a 5.8 rating.  Other reasons the ratings were very poor was the fact it was played primetime on a Sunday evening,  when the American Music Awards was live on ABC; although the AMA's drew weaker network ratings than last year's MLS Cup final.  Additionally, NBC's Sunday Night Football NFL matchup between the Philadelphia Eagles and New York Giants was given blame for drawing viewers away from MLS.

It is undisclosed what the ratings were for Canadian audiences and the Toronto area.

The match was also broadcast in 116 countries by ESPN International networks, including ESPN Atlantic, ESPN Mexico, ESPN Latin America, and ESPN America.

Analysis

The match was foreseen by many as an unexpected pairing in the championship match, although some criticized Colorado and Dallas' trip to the final to be a massive fluke,  namely due to the seeding MLS used for the playoffs.  The match, by some, was deemed a "David vs. David" match with no clear winner.

Others however, saw FC Dallas as the favorites for the match, as they had finished the regular season with only four losses,  and knocked off the Supporters Shield winners, Los Angeles Galaxy, in stunning fashion. Some analysts as early as August predicted Dallas to win the entire MLS Cup final.

Off the pitch, the final contained two league franchises that have historically drawn weaker crowds than their league counterparts. Many, including league commissioner Don Garber, believed that the fact the two clubs made it to the final would draw interest from both Denver and Dallas media outlets.

Match

The 2010 MLS Cup Final was played on November 21 at BMO Field in Toronto, Ontario, Canada. Live television coverage was provided nationally by ESPN.

First half

The 2010 MLS Cup championship kicked off at 9:00 pm Eastern Time, following a thirty-minute pre-match show on ESPN. FC Dallas had the kickoff, and immediately created the first scoring opportunity less than 30 seconds into the game. Nineteen seconds in, Dallas striker and Kittian international Atiba Harris struck a low strike from the upper corner of the penalty box that skimmed wide of the crossbar. The shot was barely deflected by Colorado Rapids' goalkeeper, Matt Pickens. Should have Harris' scored, it would have been the fastest goal scored in MLS Cup history.

It would not be until the sixth minute of play that the Colorado Rapids had their first opportunity on goal. Rapids midfielder, Kosuke Kimura made a long range effort to be saved by Dallas goalie, Kevin Hartman. Hartman's clearance was quickly intercepted by the Rapids central midfielder, Jeff Larentowicz who immediately distributed the ball to teammate, Drew Moor. Moor's shot ended up being off frame of the goal, leading to a goal kick for Dallas.

Following the early wave of attack from Dallas, the Rapids leaned to a more defensive, conservative style of play. The Rapids were able to capitalize on numerous fouls that they caused Dallas to inflict on them. For the following three minutes, Dallas caused four fouls on Colorado, including a Brek Shea fouling Omar Cummings in the ninth of play, which led to a dangerous set piece for Colorado.

Dallas continued to prounce of goalscoring opportunities for a majority of the first half, only to see a majority of their shots either go wide or saved.

In the 35th minute of play, FC Dallas defender George John ran down the right flank of the pitch, and made a long cross into the penalty box. The cross was successfully met with Dallas striker David Ferreira. Ferreira, who had previously been announced the league's Most Valuable Player, buried the ball in the back of the next, opening the score sheet and giving Dallas a 1–0 lead over Colorado.

Going into halftime, Dallas held a 1–0 lead over Colorado.

Second half

In the 57th minute, Conor Casey received a low cross from Jamie Smith. As he collected the ball in the penalty box, Casey collided with FC Dallas goalkeeper, Kevin Hartman. In the chaos surrounding the clash of players, the ball was loose near Casey's right foot, and while sitting down, kicked the ball into the net, leveling Colorado with Dallas.

For the remainder of the match, most of the possession was dominated by Dallas, who consistently failed to find the back of the net, and even hit the post in the 86th minute. Frantic play from Colorado at the end almost cost them the game, but a shot inches wide led to extra time.

Extra time 

With the Rapids and FC Dallas tied at one apiece at the end of regulation, the match went into extra time, consisting of two fifteen-minute periods, culminated by penalty kicks if needed. It was the second-consecutive year the cup final went into extra time, and the fourth time in the past five years that an MLS Cup final went into extra time.

For most of the first period, only Dallas was able to make any threatening scoring opportunities on Colorado, even though the Rapids were able to create a handful of counterattacks. Many of their shots failed to be threatening.

In the second period of extra time, in the 107th minute, Senegalese-striker Macoumba Kandji of Colorado slowly dribbled the ball into the goal box and attempted to chip the ball into the goal. Dallas defender George John attempted to deflect the cross, but it inadvertently struck the wrong side of his thigh, barreling into the net, for an own goal, the first ever in MLS Cup history. Kandji ended up tearing his ACL on the tackle after his shot. The goal gave Colorado the victory, and their first MLS Cup title in club history. It was also the first time an American soccer club based in Colorado won a cup title since the Colorado Foxes won the APSL championship in 1993.

Match details

Statistics
Overall

Post-match 
 With the cup title, Colorado Rapids became the first Coloradan club to win any cup or league championship since the Colorado Avalanche won the Stanley Cup after the 2000-2001 NHL season. As champions, the Rapids earned a direct berth into Group Stage of the 2011–12 CONCACAF Champions League, which will be their second-ever appearance in a CONCACAF competition. FC Dallas will earn their first ever trip to any CONCACAF-competition by earning a Preliminary Round spot in the Champions League.

Colorado's head coach, Gary Smith, became the first British coach to win the MLS Cup championship.

Later on, the result of the Cup and the Playoffs caused MLS to make revisions to its playoff structure, which it had been using since 2006.  The new changes to the playoffs, included the top three clubs in each conference a guaranteed playoff spot.  This format guarantees at least one club from each conference will play in the conference championship round. This is a likely decision following two clubs, Colorado and San Jose, who competed for the conference title for a division they do not play in.

This MLS Cup also forced the league's hand with regard to neutral-site finals. As MLS in 2010 was not a well-supported league with mass popularity across North America, MLS Cup finals frequently had scattered attendance, with swathes of no-shows on matchday. The next season (2011), MLS Cup was played at the previously-announced home venue of one of the participating teams, which later that year led to the league announcing future MLS Cups would be held at the home venue of the higher-seeded team.

The following season, both clubs returned to the MLS Cup Playoffs, but neither reached the championship. In the newly created wildcard round, FC Dallas was eliminated by New York Red Bulls. The Colorado Rapids were eliminated by Sporting Kansas City in the Eastern Conference semi-finals.

References

2010

2010 in Canadian soccer
Colorado Rapids matches
FC Dallas matches
Soccer in Toronto
Sports competitions in Toronto
November 2010 sports events in Canada
2010 in Toronto